The Madonna and Child with Three Saints is a 1490-1500 tempera on canvas painting attributed to Andrea Mantegna, now in the Musée Jacquemart-André in Paris. Heavily damaged, not all art historians attribute it as an autograph work. If it is, it belongs to a group of small-format Madonnas for private devotions, which also includes Holy Family with Saints Anne and John the Baptist (Dresden), Holy Family with a Female Saint (Verona) and Madonna and Child with Saints (Turin). The Madonna's face touches that of her son in a manner reminiscent of the Madonna with Sleeping Child (Berlin). To the left is a female saint, possibly Mary Magdalene, whilst to the right are saint Joseph and another unidentifiable male saint.

References

1500 paintings
Paintings of the Madonna and Child by Andrea Mantegna
Paintings in the collection of the Musée Jacquemart-André